Sørhortane is a group of rock crags along the northeast edge of Horteriset Dome, southward of the Petermann Ranges in Queen Maud Land. They were photographed from the air by the German Antarctic Expedition of 1938–39. They were mapped by Norwegian cartographers from surveys and air photos by the Norwegian Antarctic Expedition (1956–60) and named Sørhortane.

References

Cliffs of Queen Maud Land
Princess Astrid Coast